In the Inuit religion an ijiraq (  or  ) is a shapeshifting creature that is said to kidnap children, hide them away and abandon them. The inuksugaq (or inukshuk) of stone allow these children to find their way back if they can convince the ijiraq to let them go.

Description 
In North Baffin dialects ijiraq means Shape Shifter. While Tariaksuq appear like a half-man-half-caribou monster, an ijiraq can appear in any form it chooses, making it particularly deceptive. Their eyes will always stay red, no matter what they shapeshift into. Their real form is just like a human, but their eyes and mouth are sideways. (The book of Dutch writer Floortje Zwigtman says only the shaman knows the real form of the Ijiraq). When you are hunting somewhere that Ijirait (plural) inhabit, you will see them in the corner of your eye for a fleeting moment (like tariaksuq, shadow people) (following another reference, you see a strange caribou in the corner of your eye instead of a normal shadow). If you try to observe them directly however, they are completely elusive. They are sometimes helpful, sometimes fatally deceptive.

Freeman's Cove 
One of the most noted places in the Arctic for sightings of these shape shifters (and tariaksuq) is the Freeman's Cove area of Tuktusirvik (place to hunt caribou), Bathurst Island. This rich oasis is surrounded in a horseshoe pattern by dormant volcanic mountains. Historically, Freeman's Cove is most notable as a stopover for the ship the Intrepid on an Arctic expedition with Edward Belcher.

Story  
The Ijirait are said to inhabit a place between two worlds; not quite inside this one, nor quite out of it. Inuit further south than the North Baffin group used to hold to a belief that some Inuit went too far north in the chase for game, and became trapped between the world of the dead and the world of the living, and thus became the Ijirait. According to the small handful of surviving elders in the South Baffin Region that knew these beliefs, the Inuit that are settled in Resolute and Grise Fiord are these shape shifters or shadow people, because they went too far north. Some elders will avoid being in presence of extreme-northern Inuit, fearing they are evil Ijirait or Tariaksuq.

The home of the Ijirait is said to be cursed, and one will lose their way, no matter how skilled or familiar with the land.

Scientific understanding 
One plausible explanation for this unusual phenomenon is likely related to large deposits of sour gas, of which can be disturbed by simply walking over top of the pockets, causing them to expel the toxic gas hydrogen sulphide. Exposure to hydrogen sulphide is known to cause hallucinations and memory loss. Gas and sulphur smoke have been reported in the area as well as hot water springs discovered by the Amarualik (meaning wolf-like) family; all of which could cause a "mirage" causing to the traveller to see things such as Ijirait and Tariaksuq. The gas vapour or pockets low in oxygen could also account for hallucinations/sensations of being watched.

References

Footnotes

Sources

 Cory K. Buott, Air Radio Operator, Resolute Bay, NU
 Simon Idlout, Elder, Qausuittuq Hunter/Trapper Organization Representative, Resolute Bay, NU
 Lallie Idlout, Nunavut Justice of the Peace, Board Member Nunavut Arctic College, Resolute Bay Nunavut
 Qammajuq (Johnny), Inuit Elder, Well known survivor of the Quganajuq (Creswell Bay, Somerset Island (Nunavut)) Tragedy, Cambridge Bay, NU
 Kenn Borek Air/Unaalik Aviation, Resolute Bay, NU
 Ministry of Natural Resources Intercontinental Polar Shelf Project, Resolute Bay, NU
 Hamlet Office, The Hamlet of Resolute Bay, Resolute Bay NU X0A 0V0 Canada (Tel. 876.252.3616)

External links
 inuitmyths.com

Inuit legendary creatures
Therianthropy